McMeekin may refer to:

 Clark McMeekin, joint pseudonym of American authors Dorothy Clark and Isabel McMeekin
 Duncan McMeekin (born 1955), justice of Supreme Court of Queensland
 Isabel McMeekin (1895-1973), American author under the pseudonym Clark McMeekin
 Richard McMeekin, Ontario, Canada politician
 Sean McMeekin (born 1974), American historian
 Ted McMeekin (born 1948), Ontario, Canada politician
 Terence McMeekin (1918–1984), lieutenant general in the British Army
 Thomas McMeekin (1866–1946), British sailor and 1908 Olympic Champion

See also
Variations on the surname:
 Meehan
 Mehigan, Meighan and Meighen